Frances Webster (born 1947) was a netball player who played 9 times for the New Zealand national netball team.

Frances Paranihia Webster (née Wiringi) was born on 1 January 1947. She was a track and field athlete and played netball for Rotorua. As Frances Wiringi, she was first picked for the national netball team, known as the Silver Ferns, in 1969, making her debut against Australia in June of that year, when she became the 47th woman to play for the team. She was part of the team that competed in the 1971 World Netball Championships when New Zealand came second. She played in the Goal Shooter (GS), Goal attack (GA) and Wing attack (WA) positions. In 1974, Webster left New Zealand and moved to Queensland in Australia.

References

1947 births
Living people
New Zealand international netball players
1971 World Netball Championships players